Aphanostola atripalpis is a species of moth in the family Gelechiidae. It was described by Edward Meyrick in 1931. It is found in Bihar in eastern India.

Adults were reared from pupae found on the leaves of Acacia catechu.

References

Gelechiinae
Moths described in 1931
Moths of Asia